Delta Phi Delta is a national art honorary society. Organized as the Palette Club on January 10, 1909 at the University of Kansas, it was renamed Delta Phi Delta on 28 May 1912. The society is open to men and women. Its official magazine, the Palette, started publication in 1911.

The Fraternity counts Foster Gribble as its founder.

The society's key features the Greek letters Delta Phi Delta across an art pallet.

Chapter list
The chapters chartered until 1964:
1909 Alpha, University of Kansas
1918 Beta, University of Montana
1919 Gamma, University of Minnesota
1920 Delta, Bethany College
1920 Epsilon, Washburn University
1921 Eta, University of Wisconsin
1921 Zeta, Chicago Art Institute
1922 Theta, Ohio Wesleyan University
1922 Kappa, North Dakota 
1922 Lambda, Drake 
1922 Iota, Ohio 
1924 Mu, Missouri 
1926 Nu, James Millikin 
1928 Omicron, Iowa State 
1929 Pi, California 
1930 Rho, Colorado 
1930 Sigma, Washington State 
1930 Tau Miami ( Ohio ) 
1931 Upsilon, Southern California 
1932 Phi, Montana State
1932 Chi, Edinboro State ( Pa . ) 
1936 Psi, Nebraska 
1936 Omega Oklahoma 
1936 Alpha Alpha, New Mexico 
1938 Alpha Beta, California Arts and Crafts 
1938 Alpha Gamma, Colorado State ( Greeley ) 
1939 Alpha Delta, Ohio State 
1940 Alpha Epsilon, Texas Woman ' s 
1941 Alpha Zeta, Cincinnati 
1944 Alpha Eta, Ball State 
1945 Alpha Theta, Southwest Missouri State 
1946 Alpha Kappa, San Jose State 
1946 Alpha Lambda, Indiana State ( Pa . ) 
1948 Alpha Mu, Michigan State 
1948 Alpha Nu, Illinois Wesleyan 
1948 Alpha Xi, Bowling Green 
1949 Alpha Omicron, Puget Sound 
1951 Alpha Pi, Bradley 
1952 Alpha Rho, Kansas State 
1956 Alpha Sigma, Mount Mary ( Wis . )
1959 Alpha Tau, St . Mary, Omaha, Neb 
1960 Alpha Upsilon, Purdue 
1960 Alpha Phi, East Carolina 
1964 Alpha Chi, Coll . of St . Catherine ( Minn . ) 
1964 Alpha Psi, Northern State ( N . D . )

Laureate members
Delta Phi Delta has honored the following well known artists with Laureate memberships.
Foster Gribble
Ruth Raymond
Birger Sandzen
Edwin O. Christensen
Francis D. Whittemore
William Griffith
Lorado Taft
Levon West
Oscar B. Jacobson
Jon Jonson
Grant Wood
Boardman Robinson
Raymond Johnson
Wayman Adams
Dwight Kirsch
John Rood
Abraham Rattner
Bruce Haswell
Muriel Sibell Wolle
Eugene Francis Savage
Buckminster Fuller
Bruce Goff

References

Honor societies
Student organizations established in 1912
Former members of Association of College Honor Societies
1912 establishments in Kansas